Ionel Sânteiu (born 6 March 1948) is a former Romanian tennis player. His highest ATP ranking was number 272 achieved on 14 June 1976.

External links
 

Romanian male tennis players
Living people
1948 births
20th-century Romanian people
Place of birth missing (living people)